Meldi Mata is a Hindu goddess and household deity who protects farmland. A legend says that she can grant any wish. She is mainly famous in the western state of Gujarat. She is a revered  goddess for low-caste Hindus and people of Chunvalia Koli. Her vahana is a goat. She has eight hands which hold a variety of weapons.

References 

Mother goddesses
Hindu goddesses